The Megalai Ehoiai, or Great Ehoiai, is a fragmentary Greek epic poem that was popularly, though not universally, attributed to Hesiod during antiquity. Like the more widely read Hesiodic Catalogue of Women, the Megalai Ehoiai was a genealogical poem structured around the exposition of heroic family trees among which myths concerning many of their members were narrated. At least seventeen fragments of the poem are transmitted by quotations in other ancient authors and two second-century CE papyri, but given the similarities between the Megalai Ehoiai and Catalogue of Women it is possible that some fragments attributed to the Catalogue actually derive from the less popular Hesiodic work. Indeed, most of the scholarly attention devoted to the poem has been concerned with its relation to the Catalogue and whether or not the title "Megalai Ehoiai" in fact referred to a single, independent epic.

Select editions and translations

Critical editions
 .
 .
 .
 .

Translations
 . (The link is to the 1st edition of 1914.) English translation with facing Greek text of all the fragments in  except for frr. 251(a) and 259(a).
 .
 .

References

Bibliography
 .
 .
 .
 .
 .
 .
 .
 .
 .
 .

External links

Ancient Greek epic poems
Women in Greek mythology
Lost poems
Hesiod